The 1954 Kansas Jayhawks football team represented the University of Kansas in the Big Seven Conference during the 1954 college football season. In their first season under head coach Chuck Mather, the Jayhawks compiled a 0–10 record (0–6 against conference opponents), the first winless season in school history. They would not have another winless season until 2015. Kansas finished last in the Big Seven Conference, and were outscored by all opponents by a combined total of 377 to 93. They played their home games at Memorial Stadium in Lawrence, Kansas.

The team's statistical leaders included Bud Laughlin with 339 rushing yards and Bev Buller with 303 passing yards. Bud Bixler was the team captain.

Schedule

References

Kansas
Kansas Jayhawks football seasons
College football winless seasons
Kansas Jayhawks football